The East African Crude Oil Pipeline (EACOP), also known as the Uganda–Tanzania Crude Oil Pipeline (UTCOP), is a 1,443 km crude oil pipeline with a foundation stone nominally under construction since 2017 and intended to transport crude oil from Uganda's oil fields to the Port of Tanga, Tanzania on the Indian Ocean. Once completed, the pipeline will be the longest heated crude oil pipeline in the world. Because of the large scale displacement of communities and wildlife, global environmental groups are protesting its construction and finance.

Location
As of March 2016, the oil pipeline was to start in Buseruka sub-county, Hoima District, at the Lake Albert (Africa) basin in Uganda's Western Region.

Overview
In 2006, the Kingfisher oil field was discovered on the eastern bank of Lake Albert, the border between Uganda and the Democratic Republic of the Congo, spread over 344 square km in the Albertine Rift basin in western Uganda.  
As of 2015, Uganda had proven oil reserves exceeding 6.5 billion barrels, of which about 2.2 billion barrels were recoverable. As of 2013, the country had planned to build a refinery in the Western Region to meet local and regional demand, and to export the rest via pipeline to the Indian Ocean coast.

In 2013 Uganda had agreed to build a joint Uganda–Kenya Crude Oil Pipeline to the Kenyan port of Lamu.

In 2015, concerns regarding security and cost, however, motivated parallel negotiations with Tanzania regarding a shorter and safer route to Port Tanga, with the support of the French petroleum conglomerate TotalEnergies.

In April 2016, at the 13th Northern Corridor Heads of State Summit in Kampala, Uganda officially chose the Tanzania route for its crude oil, in preference to the Mombasa or Lamu routes in Kenya. The presidents of Kenya and Rwanda were present, along with representatives from Ethiopia, South Sudan, and Tanzania. At the same summit, President Uhuru Kenyatta announced that Kenya would build the Kenya Crude Oil Pipeline on its own, thereby abandoning the Uganda–Kenya Crude Oil Pipeline.
As of August 2017, the pipeline was planned to have a capacity of 216,000 barrels of crude oil per day. to be  in diameter, and Uganda was to pay Tanzania US$12.20 for every barrel flowing through the pipeline.

In December 2021, the Ugandan parliament passed the East African Crude Oil Pipeline Special Provisions Bill into Ugandan law. A similar law had been passed by the Parliament of Tanzania, in August 2021. The new act of parliament governs the county's participation in the estimated US$3.5 billion EACOP construction, operations and maintenance. Uganda's contribution was estimated at US$293 million, of which US$130 million had been paid in advance.

Cost, funding, and timetable
As of March 2016, construction was planned to start in August 2016 and expected to last three years at a cost of US$4 billion, providing approximately 15,000 construction jobs and 1,000 to 2,000 permanent jobs. In March 2016, the Daily Monitor newspaper reported that Total E&P was prepared to spend US$4 billion (UGX:13 trillion) to fund EACOP construction. In July 2016, following meetings between delegations led by the oil ministers of Tanzania and Uganda, held in Hoima, it was announced that construction of the  pipeline would begin in January 2017, and completion was planned for 2020.

As of August 2017, the construction budget for the  pipeline was US$3.5 billion.

In September 2020, TotalEnergies and the government of Uganda signed a Host Government Agreement about Total´s rights and obligations with respect to the development, construction, and operation of EACOP, at State House Entebbe. This was expected to lead to Final Investment Decision, by the end of 2020.

Two days later in September 2020, President Yoweri Museveni of Uganda and President John Pombe Magufuli of Tanzania signed an agreement in Chato, Tanzania, committing to jointly construct the  East Africa Crude Oil Pipeline, at an estimated cost of US$3.5 billion. Work on the pipeline is scheduled to start by the end of 2020. Once started, construction of the pipeline is expected to last about 36 months.

In October 2020, TotalEnergies and the Government of Tanzania signed a Host Government Agreement to govern the dealings of the two entities regarding the EACOP, 70 percent of which will pass through Tanzanian territory. Laying of the pipeline was anticipated to begin during the first quarter of 2021.

In April 2021, presidents Yoweri Museveni of Uganda and Samia Suluhu of Tanzania met in Entebbe, Uganda with Patrick Pouyanné, the Chairman/CEO of TotalEnergies and Chen Zhuoubiao, President of CNOOC Uganda along with Ugandan and Tanzanian technocrats, lawyers and government ministers, to sign a number of agreements, allowing the beginning of construction of the EACOP. Construction is now slated to begin in July 2021, with first oil anticipated in 2025.

In August 2021, the total project cost was reported as US$5 billion, of which $2 billion were to be raised by the owners of the pipeline as equity investment and the remaining $3 billion were to be borrowed from external sources.

Ownership
In August 2017, the plan was to raise 70 percent of $3.5b financing capital needed from international lenders and 30 percent through Total, the Anglo-Irish Tullow and China National Offshore Oil Corporation (Cnooc), the Tanzania Petroleum Development Corporation and Uganda National Oil Company; the final investment decision was expected at the end of 2017. Uganda and Tanzania were advised by Standard Bank of South Africa, while Total SA was advised by Sumitomo Mitsui Banking Corporation. The London-based firm law firm Clifford Chance was advising TotalEnergies on legal matters, while CNOOC was advised by the Imperial Bank of China.

In March 2019, Uganda´s National Oil Company took 15 percent shares in EACOP, Tanzania 5 per cent, Tullow shares 10 per cent, Chinese CNOOC 35 percent and Total 35 percent.

In April 2020, Tullow Oil Plc sold its "entire interests in Uganda's Lake Albert development project, including the East African Crude Oil Pipeline", to TotalEnergies, for US$575 million with all tax liabilities.  
That ownership changed in April 2021, at the signing of the definitive investment agreements.

Final investment decision, 2022
On Tuesday, 1 February 2022, the President of Uganda Yoweri Museveni, the Vice President of Tanzania Philip Mpango, the Executive Chairman/CEO of TotalEnergies, Patrick Pouyanné, the president of CNOOC Uganda Limited, Chen Zhuobiao; Ugandan cabinet ministers, oil technocrats from Uganda and Tanzania and other invited guests gathered at Kololo in Kampala, to witness the signing of the final investment decision by TotalEnergies and CNOOC.

Other related parties to the EACOP, who were represented at the FID signing included the Uganda National Oil Company , Petroleum Authority of Uganda, TotalEnergies Uganda and Tanzania Petroleum Development Corporation.

Construction
In 2017, Musoveni laid the foundation stone, and the press reported that construction had begun.

In July 2022, the engineering, procurement and construction (EPC) contract was awarded to a joint venture comprising the Australian  Worley Limited (formerly Worley Parsons Limited) and China Petroleum Pipeline Engineering and construction was expected to begin in the first half of 2023 at an estimated budget cost of between US$3 billion and US$4 billion with first oil expected in 2025.

Pipeline insurance
In August 2022, Ugandan online media reported that licensing, registration and shareholding paperwork had been submitted, received and approved by the Insurance Regulatory Authority of Uganda for the Insurance Consortium for Oil and Gas Uganda (ICOGU) to insure the EACOP.
In February 2023, Ugandan, Tanzanian and an US organisation filed a complaint against the US insurance broker Marsh with the OECD about violating "the guidelines governing the actions of multinational corporations with regard to respect for human rights and the environment".

Oil refinery

As of September 2013 an oil refinery was planned to be constructed in western Uganda to process the oil for use within the East African Community. The US$2.5 billion project was to be developed under a public-private partnership, with 50 percent of the project owned by a private developer and 10 percent owned by Jk Minerals Africa of South Africa, the remaining 40 percent to be distributed among the East African countries. In April 2016, Tanzania agreed to buy 8 percent of the shares in the refinery for US$150.4 million.

Social and environmental impact 
The East African Crude Oil Pipeline (EACOP) project is expected to emit 379 million tonnes of climate-heating pollution, more than 25 times the combined annual emissions of Uganda and Tanzania, the host nations. The pipeline poses high risks of freshwater pollution and degradation, particularly to the Lake Victoria basin, where 400 kilometres of the pipeline will be laid. Once built, EACOP will cause irreversible damage to biodiversity, natural habitats and water sources. It also carries significant global impacts by contributing to global warming.

The project will "displace thousands of small farmers and put key wildlife habitat and coastal waters at risk." As of 2020, civil society organizations have petitioned funding agencies not to support the project, citing potential social and environmental harm that the pipeline will cause.
According to an Environmental Impact Assessment and social impact assessment from 2019, the pipeline will disproportionally and negatively impact women including loss of income because of displacement, loss of land, loss of power in the household if men earn cash wages, increase in sex work as well as more unpaid care work. 

The #StopEACOP campaign is a global campaign against the construction of the pipeline. Campaigners argue that, as the world's longest heated oil pipeline which will run through many populated areas, it will contribute to poor social outcomes for those displaced. They also mention the significant risk to nature and biodiversity, as the pipeline runs through large areas of savannah, zones of high biodiversity value, mangroves, coastal waters, and protected areas, before arriving at the coast where an oil spill could be dire. Spills are deemed more likely given the route through areas with seismic activity. Critics of the project also point to the negative hydrological impact on the surface and groundwater resources of Lake Turkana and to the fact that the pipeline will add another major source of oil to global markets and thereby contribute to anthropogenic climate change.

In September 2022, the European Parliament passed a resolution condemning the EACOP project, calling for “the end of the extractive activities in protected and sensitive ecosystems, including the shores of Lake Albert".

See also

 Petroleum Authority of Uganda
 Kenya–Uganda–Rwanda Petroleum Products Pipeline
 Hoima–Kampala Petroleum Products Pipeline
 Tanzania-Uganda Natural Gas Pipeline

References

External links
 Official Website

 East African Crude Oil Pipeline at the Global Energy Monitor.
 As of 18 March 2019.

Proposed energy infrastructure in Africa
Oil pipelines in Tanzania
Oil pipelines in Uganda
Petroleum infrastructure in Tanzania
Petroleum infrastructure in Uganda
Tanzania–Uganda relations